The fifth season of the animated television series Johnny Test originally aired on Cartoon Network in the United States. The season was announced by Cookie Jar Entertainment on August 24, 2010, consisting of 26 episodes, with two segments each. In the United States, the season premiered on Cartoon Network on June 13, 2011. This would be the first season with Trevor Devall as the new voice of Dukey. Additionally, Brittney Wilson, who departed after Season 1, would return to voice Mary Test and Sissy Blakely. According to the credits, Warner Bros. still owns its trademark.

Cast
 James Arnold Taylor as Johnny Test
 Trevor Devall as Dukey
 Brittney Wilson as Mary Test
 Maryke Hendrikse as Susan Test

Episodes

References

2011 American television seasons
2012 American television seasons
Johnny Test seasons
2011 Canadian television seasons
2012 Canadian television seasons